Cowan Township is an inactive township in Wayne County, in the U.S. state of Missouri.

Cowan Township has the name of Richard "Uncle Dicky" Cowan, a pioneer settler.

References

Townships in Missouri
Townships in Wayne County, Missouri